Tamally Maak  (Arabic : تملي معاك ) also often also Tamally Ma'ak or Tamalli ma'ak is a 2000 album by Amr Diab that contains his international hit single of the same name. The Album earned a huge success in MENA and the world.

Track listing
Credits adapted from CD booklet.

Credits
Credits adapted from CD booklet.

Arranged By – Tarek Madkour 

Producer – Mohsen Gaber 

Strings – Dr. Yehia El-Mogy 

Record label – Alam El Phan

References

2000 albums
Amr Diab albums